RIAS or Rias may refer to:
 Recording Industry Association Singapore
Regulatory Impact Analysis Statement, a description of the impact of new Canadian federal regulations
Remote Infrared Audible Signage
Research Institute for Advanced Studies, the former research facility created by the Glenn L. Martin Company
Reynolds Intellectual Assessment Scales, an intelligence test
Royal Incorporation of Architects in Scotland, a professional body
Rundfunk im amerikanischen Sektor (Broadcasting in the American Sector), a radio and television station in West Berlin, Germany
 RIAS Symphonie-Orchester, now called the Deutsches Symphonie-Orchester Berlin, is a broadcast orchestra based in Berlin
 RIAS Kammerchor, a choir founded as a radio choir and based in Berlin
Rias Gremory, a fictional character in the High School DxD franchise
Rias Line, a railway line in Japan

See also 
 RIA (disambiguation)
 Rías Altas, a section of A Costa do Marisco (the Seafood Coast) in Galicia, Spain
 Rías Baixas, a series of four estuarine inlets located on the southwestern coast of Galicia, Spain